Godfrey Owese Okumu is a Kenyan volleyball coach. He is also a former player who has played for the Kenyan national volleyball team. Okumu is a native of Nyanza.

Playing career
As a player, Okumu played for various clubs as well as the Kenyan men's national volleyball team from 1990 to 2003. After his retirement, he moved to Japan.He worked as an English teacher in the Kumamoto Prefecture in 2002 before coaching.

Coaching career
Godfrey Okumu is a holder of a FIVB Level 3 coaching certificate and is a member of the Japanese Society of Volleyball Research.

In Japan
After his playing career, Okumu moved to Japan sometime in the 2000s. Okumu served as part of the coaching staff of the Oita Miyoshi Weisse Adler men's professional volleyball club from 2006 to 2012. He also served as coach of the Hataka Girls High School volleyball team as well.

Kenyan women's national team
The Kenyan women's national team had Okumu as part of their coaching staff at the 2006 and 2010 FIVB Volleyball Women's World Championships, as well as in the 2011 and 2015 FIVB Volleyball Women's World Cups.

In the Philippines
Okumu served as head Coach of UP Lady Fighting Maroons, the women's volleyball collegiate team of the University of the Philippines. In September 2017, Okumu was announced as the new head coach of the team. Okumu's first stint with the team was at UAAP Season 80 which took place 2018. Okumu has said that he will introduce the "Japanese style" of play to the collegiate team which he learned in his Japan stint.

In July 2022, Okumu announced his departure from the team.

Personal life
Okumu has a daughter named Hawi Fuyumi, who plays professionally in Japan. As of 2017, Fuyumi plays for Hitachi Rivale.

References

Year of birth missing (living people)
Living people
People from Nyanza Province
Kenyan men's volleyball players
Kenyan expatriate sportspeople in Japan
Kenyan expatriate sportspeople in the Philippines
Kenyan sports coaches
Academic staff of the University of the Philippines Diliman